The 4th Discover Screenwriting Award, given by the American Screenwriters Association, honored the best screenwriter(s) of 2004.

Winner and nominees
 Paul Haggis – Million Dollar Baby
 Terry George and Keir Pearson – Hotel Rwanda
 David Magee – Finding Neverland
 Patrick Marber – Closer
 José Rivera – The Motorcycle Diaries

American Screenwriters Association Awards
2004 film awards